Straight Down to Business is the fourth album by the American musical group Ready for the World, released in 1991 via MCA Records. "Straight Down to Business" was released as a single.

Critical reception

The Washington Post wrote that "between the scratches and samples, RFTW sing characteristically steamy ballads like the harmonic "Ask Your Lover'."

Track listing
"Nuttin' But a Party" 
"Straight Down to Business" 
"Cat-Thang"
"World Party"
"Ask Your Lover"
"P.B.S.L."
"Can He Do It (Like This, Can He Do It Like That)?"
"No More Mr. Nice Guy"
"Yo, That's a Lot of Body"
"Panties and Draws"
"Would You Make Me"
"Cat-Thang (Mental Mix)"

References

Ready for the World albums
1991 albums
MCA Records albums